Gilbert Le Coze (1945 – 28 July 1994) was a French chef known for his innovative methods in seafood preparation. Le Coze's cooking has been compared to Japanese cuisine and has influenced a generation of American cooks.

In 1972 he left Brittany to open his own restaurant in Paris, Les Moines de St. Bernardin with his sister Maguy Le Coze. 

In 1986, the Equitable Life Assurance Company invited them to move the restaurant to the company's Manhattan headquarters. The restaurant's name was simplified to Le Bernardin. Le Coze worked with original Chef de Cuisine, Chef Eberhard Müller, and later, future head chef Eric Ripert. The restaurant gained two Michelin stars under Le Coze's management.

Death
Le Coze died in Manhattan of a heart attack on 28 July 1994 while exercising at a health club.

Nominations
James Beard Award for Outstanding Restaurant 
James Beard Award for Best Chef: New York City

References

1945 births
1994 deaths
French chefs
Chefs of French cuisine
Head chefs of Michelin starred restaurants
French emigrants to the United States
Male chefs